Translation initiation factor IF-2, mitochondrial is a protein that in humans is encoded by the MTIF2 gene.

During the initiation of protein biosynthesis, initiation factor-2 (IF-2) promotes the binding of the initiator tRNA to the small subunit of the ribosome in a GTP-dependent manner. Prokaryotic IF-2 is a single polypeptide, while eukaryotic cytoplasmic IF-2 (eIF-2) is a trimeric protein. Bovine liver mitochondria contain IF-2(mt), an 85-kD monomeric protein that is equivalent to prokaryotic IF-2. The predicted 727-amino acid human protein contains a 29-amino acid presequence. Human IF-2(mt) shares 32 to 38% amino acid sequence identity with yeast IF-2(mt) and several prokaryotic IF-2s, with the greatest degree of conservation in the G domains of the proteins. Two transcript variants encoding the same protein have been found for this gene.

References

Further reading